Mohammad Ali Ramezanian (born 19 February 1993) is an Iranian football goalkeeper currently playing for Tractor.

Club career
He is a product of Tractor youth academy, where he played at least a season before coming to playing for the senior team. He is always considered as the third goalkeeper of Tractor. He was playing under former Team Meli player Rasoul Khatibi and under the former S.L. Benfica manager Toni, He did not play a minute in Persian Gulf Pro League. He was part of the team during the AFC Champions League matches.

Honors
Tractor
Hazfi Cup (1): 2013–14

References

ffiri.ir

1993 births
Living people
Iranian footballers
Tractor S.C. players
Association football goalkeepers
People from Babol
Sportspeople from Mazandaran province